Ekosso is a town in the Plateaux Department of the Republic of the Congo.

Ekosso is also a name of Bantu origin.

Populated places in the Republic of the Congo
Plateaux Department (Republic of the Congo)